Winter Songs Tour Tracks is the fourth EP released by Screaming Trees. The CD was issued as a promo for the band while on tour with Alice in Chains and Gruntruck in Fall 1992.

Track listing
 "Nearly Lost You"
 "Bed of Roses"
 "Something About Today (Numb Inversion Version)"
 "E.S.K."
 "Troubled Times"
 "Dollar Bill"
 "Tomorrow's Dream" (Black Sabbath cover)
 "Shadow Of The Season"

1992 EPs